Pietro Koch (18 August 1918 – 4 June 1945) was an Italian soldier and leader of the Banda Koch, a group notorious for its anti-partisan activity in the Republic of Salò.

Biography
The son of an Imperial German Navy officer, Koch was born in Benevento. Koch served as a lieutenant in the Grenadiers where he was unpopular with his fellow soldiers and was dismissed from the Italian Royal Army in 1939 for insulting a superior officer. Recalled on the eve of the war, he saw continuous service until the armistice of September 1943, after which he moved to Florence.

Settling in the Social Republic in the north of Italy, Koch joined the Special Service of Republican Police led by Tullio Tamburini. In January 1944, he established the Banda Koch as a special task force charged with hunting down partisans and rounding up deportees for the Germans. Koch came under the protection of Herbert Kappler, SD chief in Koch's base of Rome, and as such had a free hand to employ whatever tactics he saw fit with Banda Koch, which soon became a by-word for cruelty and violence. Koch was given his own prisons and torture chambers and continued his activity in Florence and then Milan following the fall of Rome to the Allies. Along with police chief Pietro Caruso, who was independently involved in the killing of partisans, Koch was behind hundreds of deaths; the Social Republic government even ordered an amnesty for political prisoners not charged with murder out of fear that Koch would have them killed.

Feared even by Benito Mussolini for his violent extremism, Il Duce eventually had his close ally Renzo Montagna arrest Koch for his excesses in October 1944. He soon fell into Allied hands, was tried by an Italian tribunal and was convicted of six charges at the High Court. He was executed at Rome's Forte Bravetta aged 26.

References

1918 births
1945 deaths
People from Benevento
Politicide perpetrators
Italian people of German descent
People of the Italian Social Republic
Italian mass murderers
Italian military personnel of World War II
Italian people convicted of war crimes
Italian police officers
Executed Italian people
20th-century executions by Italy
People executed for war crimes
Executed mass murderers